Changwon  FC is a South Korean football club based in the city of Changwon. The team plays in the K3 League, the third tier of South Korean football league system.

Honours

Domestic competitions

League
 Korea National League (regular season) 
 Winners (1) : 2009
 Runners-up (2): 2006, 2015

 K3 League 
 Winners (1) : 2022

Cups
 National League Championship
 Winners (2) : 2006, 2017
 Runners-up (1) : 2011

Season-by-season records

Current squad

References

Korea National League clubs
Football clubs in South Gyeongsang Province
Sport in Changwon
Association football clubs established in 2005
Changwon City FC
2005 establishments in South Korea
K3 League clubs